The Portsmouth Truckers were a Virginia League baseball team based in Portsmouth, Virginia, United States that existed on-and-off from 1895 to 1928. They also played in the Piedmont League in 1935, when they were affiliated with the Chicago Cubs.

In 1920, under managers Jim Barton and Jim Viox, they won the first of multiple league championships. They won their next the next season under Viox's guidance. They won their third and final league championship in 1927 under the eye of Zinn Beck.

References

Baseball teams established in 1895
Defunct minor league baseball teams
Portsmouth, Virginia
Defunct baseball teams in Virginia
Chicago Cubs minor league affiliates
1895 establishments in Virginia
1935 disestablishments in Virginia
Sports clubs disestablished in 1935
Baseball teams disestablished in 1935
Piedmont League teams
Virginia League teams